The New Zealand AK class carriage is a type of 17 cars built by Dunedin's Hillside Workshops for KiwiRail's long-distance passenger operation The Great Journeys of New Zealand. Consisting of 11 AK saloon carriages and four AKC café carriages, supplemented by three AKL luggage vans and four AKV open-air viewing/generator vans converted from AG vans, similar to those previously used on the Coastal Pacific and the TranzAlpine. The AK class are the first new carriages to be built in New Zealand since 1943.

Introduction
Two AK cars, one AKC car, one AKL car and an AKV car entered service on the Coastal Pacific on 2 November 2011.

The class is used on the Coastal Pacific, the Northern Explorer and the TranzAlpine, replacing panorama 56-foot carriages. Funding of $NZ39.9 million was announced by the fifth National government in March 2009.

The class features a new white livery with the KiwiRail logo.

Due to passenger loadings falling on both South Island trains as a result of the February 2011 Christchurch earthquake, three AK, one AKC, one AKL and one AKV were transferred to the North Island for the new three-times-a-week Auckland-Wellington Northern Explorer. In late 2018, the redistributed Coastal Pacific carriages were returned for the re-opening of the service in December 2018.

As part of the re-opening of the Coastal Pacific, the Government and KiwiRail announced new NZ$40 million carriage investment including new premium carriages. KiwiRail is considering converting some of the existing AK carriages to Premium Carriages.

Design

The class was designed by KiwiRail's mechanical design staff in Wellington. It has GPS-triggered announcements, with displays on ceiling-mounted screens and commentary at each seat in five languages: English, French, German, Japanese and Mandarin. It runs on newly designed air-cushioned P11 bogies.  Seating was supplied by a Wellington-based manufacturer.

To one side of each seat is a jack for headphones for the on-board commentary, and in front of each seat is a flip-down tray table. Seats facing each other in groups of four are positioned around a fixed table. Power points are provided at each seat area. Carry-on baggage can be stored overhead.

Support vehicles

AKS
In March 2018 it was reported that two SA carriages were being overhauled and converted into luggage vans for KiwiRail Scenic Journeys. This was later revised to three SA carriage conversions into AKS luggage vans of six SA carriages moved to Hutt Workshops. The new AKS vans are fitted with a crew compartment, luggage and bicycle racks, recycling and catering storage.

AKF 
In 2023, a kitchen carriage, AKF6112 on the Tranz Alpine using SA carriages overhauled and converted into luggage vans by KiwiRail's Hutt Workshops for their "Scenic Plus" dining experience. Two other SA carriages are being overhauled as AKF kitchen carriages for the Northern Explorer and Coastal Pacific services.

References

Citations

Bibliography

External links
KiwiRail Express 19 May 2010
Hillside's $40m contract 15 May 2010 Otago Daily Times
KiwiRail website
KiwiRail Scenic website
P11 Bogie Design Case Study

Railway coaches of New Zealand